Peter Jones (born 28 December 1963) is a former Scotland international rugby union player.

Rugby union career

Amateur career

He played for Gloucester.

Provincial career

He played for Anglo-Scots district.

International career

He was capped by Scotland 'B' twice; against Ireland 'B' on 22 December 1990, and against France 'B' on 2 February 1992.

He was capped by Scotland 'A' twice; against Spain on 1991, and against Italy 1992.

He received one full senior cap by Scotland; against Wales on 21 March 1992.

References

1963 births
Living people
Scotland international rugby union players
Scotland 'B' international rugby union players
Scotland 'A' international rugby union players
Scottish rugby union players
Rugby union players from Arbroath
Gloucester Rugby players
Scottish Exiles (rugby union) players
Rugby union props